Jack Grieves (born 5 December 2004) is an English professional footballer who plays as a forward for Watford.

Career
Born in Watford, Grieves joined Watford for the second time in 2020, having already played for the club between the ages of eight and fourteen. He made his senior Watford debut on 7 January 2023, coming on as a second half substitute  for Leandro Bacuna in a 2–0 home defeat to Reading in the second round of the FA Cup.

Personal life
Grieves hails from a footballing family, with a number of relatives playing for Watford. His great-grandfather was wing-half Reg Williams, while his great-great-grandfather was goalkeeper Skilly Williams. His father, Darren, most notably played for AFC Wimbledon, while his uncle, Danny, played as a midfielder.

Career statistics

Club
.

References

2004 births
Living people
Sportspeople from Watford
Footballers from Hertfordshire
English footballers
Association football forwards
Watford F.C. players